Janet Hürlimann (née Omand)  is a former Canadian-Swiss female curler and curling coach.

Personal life
Hürlimann is married to fellow curler Patrick Hürlimann. They have three children, including Briar Hürlimann.

Teams

Record as a coach of national teams

References

External links

Living people

Swiss female curlers
Swiss curling champions
Swiss curling coaches
Canadian emigrants to Switzerland
Curlers from Ontario
Canadian women curlers
Canadian curling coaches
Year of birth missing (living people)